Hugh Mason Browne (1851–1923) was an American educator and civil rights activist who served as principal of the Institute for Colored Youth (now the Cheyney University of Pennsylvania) from 1902 to 1913. A proponent of vocational education who was active in the NAACP and philosophically aligned with Booker T. Washington, Browne oversaw the move of the Institute for Colored Youth from urban Philadelphia to rural Cheyney and founded a teacher training school at the new location. A graduate of Howard University and the Princeton Theological Seminary, Browne taught at Liberia College and Hampton University. He invented a device to stop wastewater from flowing back into homes, receiving a patent for his invention on April 29, 1890.

References 

1851 births
1923 deaths
People from Washington, D.C.
Howard University alumni
Princeton Theological Seminary alumni
American academic administrators
African-American educators
Cheyney University of Pennsylvania faculty
African Americans in Pennsylvania
Academic staff of the University of Liberia
Hampton University faculty
NAACP activists
African-American inventors